Bahria Schools and Colleges were established by the Pakistan Navy (PN) for the education of the children of its officers, sailors, and civilian employees at Karachi, Sindh.

Its branches are located in Islamabad, Karachi, Lahore, Gwadar, Ormara, Turbat, Jiwani.

Branches

 Bahria Model School & College Sabir S.R.E
 Bahria College Lahore, founded in 2012
 Bahria College Islamabad
 Bahria College NORE 1
 Bahria College Karsaz
 Bahria Model School Hanif S.R.E
 Bahria Model School and College No. 1
 Bahria Model School and College No. 2, located in Majeed SRE
 Bahria Model College Ormara
 Bahria Model College Gwadar
 Bahria Model School Jiwani
 Bahria Model School Turbat

Clubs and societies 
Bazm-i-Adab
English Literary Society
Art & Science Modeling Club

Notable alumni
 Shahid Ali Khan - retired field hockey goalkeeper from Pakistan
 Muhammad Farooq - Senior Journalist, Qari, Naat Khawan, Newscaster, Compere
 Sahir Lodhi - TV, radio compere actor, singer
 Shaista Lodhi - Geo TV host
 Javeria Saud - actress, producer, Naat Khuan, singer
 Fakhar Zaman (cricketer) - cricketer

See also 
 Bahria University
 Board of Secondary Education Karachi
 Board of Intermediate Education Karachi

References 

Schools in Karachi
Pakistan Navy
School systems in Pakistan
Military schools in Pakistan